Bolivar is a department of Colombia. It was named after one of the original nine states of the United States of Colombia. It is located to the north of the country, extending roughly north–south from the Caribbean coast at Cartagena near the mouth of the Magdalena River, then south along the river to a border with Antioch Department.The departments of Sucre and Cordoba are located to the west, and Atlantic Department to the north and east (most of the border formed by the Canal del Dique). Across the Magdalena River to the east is Magdalena Department. The flag of the department bears a resemblance to the flag of Lithuania.

Its capital is Cartagena de Indias. Other important cities include Magangue, El Carmen de Bolivar and Turbaco.

Provinces and Municipalities

Depresión Momposina
 Cicuco
 Hatillo de Loba
 Margarita
 Santa Cruz de Mompox
 San Fernando
 Talaiga Nuevo

Dique
 Arjona
 Arroyo Hondo
 Calamar
 Cartagena
 Clemencia
 Mahates
 San Cristobal
 San Estanislao
 Santa Catalina
 Santa Rosa
 Turbaco
 Turbana
 Villanueva

Loba
 Altos del Rosario
 Barranco de Loba
 Brazuelo de Papayal
 El Peñón
 Regidor
 Rio Viejo
 San Martín de Loba

Magdalena Medio
 Arenal del Sur
 Cantagallo, Bolívar
 Morales
 Norosí
 San Pablo
 Santa Rosa del Sur
 Simití

Mojana
 Achí
 Magangué
 Montecristo
 Pinillos
 San Jacinto del Cauca
 Tiquisio

Montes de Maria
 El Carmen de Bolívar
 Córdoba
 El Guamo
 María La Baja
 San Jacinto
 San Juan Nepomuceno
 Soplaviento
 Zambrano

History
In today's villages of Maria La Baja, Sincerín, El Viso, and Mahates and Rotinet, excavations have uncovered the remains of maloka-type buildings, directly related to the early Puerto Hormiga settlements.

Miscellaneous
Postage stamps of Bolívar
List of Caribbean islands#Bolívar Department

References

External links

 View a boundary-overlaid version of Bolívar on Google Maps: http://www.maplandia.com/colombia/bolivar/turbana/

 
Departments of Colombia
Caribbean region of Colombia
States and territories established in 1857
1857 establishments in the Republic of New Granada